The Milwaukee LGBT Film & Video Festival takes place every fall in Milwaukee, Wisconsin. The festival was established in 1987 and is presented by the Film Department  (now the Film, Video, Animation & New Genres department) in the Peck School of the Arts of the University of Wisconsin–Milwaukee (UWM). Opening night and centerpiece gala screenings take place at the Oriental Theatre located on the East Side of Milwaukee. In 2018 the format of the festival changed to provide screenings throughout the year instead of the concentrated 11 day format primarily screened at the UW Milwaukee Union Theatre.

Programming includes films and independent videos; the festival also books documentaries, coming out films, romantic comedies, films dealing with LGBT identity with age, race, and religion, and films from outside the United States. Each festival also includes series of "men's shorts" and "women's shorts" that include gay and lesbian themes, respectively.

Festival sponsorship comes from a variety of corporate and private donors.

Past festival highlights 
2005
Adam & Steve, Loggerheads, Unveiled, The Journey, Mysterious Skin, Guys and Balls, 100% Woman, Summer Storm, Cote D'Azur

2006
Boy Culture, Broken Sky, Small Town Gay Bar, Oublier Cheyenne, The Line of Beauty, The Blossoming of Maximo Oliveros, Lover Other, Red Doors, Another Gay Movie, Camp Out, Filthy Gorgeous: The Trannyshack Story, 20 centímetros

2007
Nina's Heavenly Delights, Shelter, FtF: Female to Femme, The Bubble, Beyond Hatred, For the Bible Tells Me So, Colma: The Musical, Itty Bitty Titty Committee

2008
Were the World Mine, It Is Not the Homosexual Who Is Perverse, But the Society in Which He Lives, La León, Butch Jamie, Save Me, The Lollipop Generation, A Horse Is Not A Metaphor, XXY, A Jihad for Love, Water Lilies, Jerusalem Is Proud to Present, The World Unseen, Saturn in Opposition, Chris & Don: A Love Story, Japan Japan

2009
Patrik, Age 1.5, An Englishman in New York, Prodicgal Sons, We Are the Mods, Straightlaced, Hannah Free, Rivers Wash Over Me, Still Black: A Portrait of Black Transmen, Fig Trees, Training Rules, Lady Trojans, Every Time I See Your Picture I Cry, To Die Like a Man, Andy Warhol's Fifteen Minutes 1985-1987, Fruit Fly, And Then Came Lola, Diagnosing Difference, Travel Queeries, Edie & Thea: A Very Long Engagement, Hollywood, Je T'aime, Factory Diaries Featuring Brigid Polk, Off and Running: An American Coming of Age Story,  Word is Out

See also
List of LGBT events
List of LGBT film festivals

References

External links 
 https://web.archive.org/web/20090728144009/http://www4.uwm.edu/psoa/programs/film/lgbtfilm/

1987 establishments in Wisconsin
Festivals in Milwaukee
LGBT events in Wisconsin
LGBT film festivals in the United States
Film festivals established in 1987
Tourist attractions in Milwaukee
Film festivals in Wisconsin
Film festivals established in 2009
2009 establishments in Wisconsin